Virginity is the state of a person who has never copulated.

Virginity may also refer to:

Virginity
Virginity of Mary
Virginity pledge

Music
Virginity, an album by Bleeding Knees Club
Virginity (song), by NMB48
"Virginity", song by System of a Down
"Virginity", song by The Piranhas
"Virginity", song by Rebecca (band)